Pihasoittajat (1969 to 1975) were a folk music band with modern popular music influences.

In 1975 they represented Finland in the Eurovision song contest, placing 7th in a field of 19. Members of the band for the contest were Arja Karlsson, Hannu Karlsson, Seppo Sillanpää, Harry Lindahl, Kim Kuusi and Henrik Bergendahl.

Pihasoittajat reformed after a 20-year break in 1995. After several concerts the second revival for the band ended with Hannu Karlsson's death in December 2000.

In 2009, Pihasoittajat reformed again featuring all the remaining original band members (including Kyösti Pärssinen who did not appear in the Eurovision song contest), but excluding Seppo Sillanpää who had formed his own group with his daughters. Tommi Bergendahl, the son of Henrik, joined the group and contributes now with his guitar and vocal bass.

External links
 Pihasoittajat in Finnish.

Eurovision Song Contest entrants for Finland
Eurovision Song Contest entrants of 1975
Finnish musical groups